Laurie Bishop (born 1970) is an American politician who serves in the Montana House of Representatives from the 60th district since 2017, as a member of the Democratic Party. During her tenure in the state house she served as chair of the Democratic caucus.

Early life and education

Laurie Bishop was born in 1970, in Rochester, New York, and grew up in Illinois and Virginia. She graduated from high school in Ohio, and graduated from Syracuse University with a Bachelor of Arts in sociology. She moved to Montana in 1996. She has been married to Storrs Bishop, with whom she had three children, for twenty-eight years and reside in Livingston, Montana.

Political career

Bishop ran for a seat in the Montana House of Representatives from the 60th district in the 2016 election with the Democratic nomination and defeated incumbent Republican Representative Debra Lamm. She defeated Republican nominee Dan Skattum in the 2018 election. Bishop defeated Republican nominee Joe Lamm, the husband of former Representative Lamm, in the 2020 election.

Bishop announced on July 1, 2021, that she would seek the Democratic nomination for a seat in the United States House of Representatives from Montana's 2nd congressional district, which had yet to be drawn after being gained in the 2020 census, in 2022. She ended her campaign after redistricting as she was drawn into the more Republican district in eastern Montana.

She served as the chair of the Democratic caucus in the state house during the 2019 session and delivered the Democratic response to Governor Greg Gianforte's State of the State Address in 2021.

Electoral history

References

Living people
People from Livingston, Montana
Syracuse University alumni
21st-century American politicians
21st-century American women politicians
Democratic Party members of the Montana House of Representatives
Women state legislators in Montana
Year of birth uncertain
1970 births